At 3:25 a.m. on 3 March 2008, two BGM-109 Tomahawk cruise missiles launched by a United States Navy warship hit the village of Dobley in Somalia. According to US military officials the target of the attack was an al-Qaeda leader. Dobley district commissioner Ali Hussein Nuir stated that Sheikh Hassan Abdullah Hersi al-Turki, a local militant cleric was meeting with leaders of a Mogadishu-based militant group nearby. Varying reports of casualties surfaced with villagers reporting that between four and six people were dead. It is unclear whether these casualties were targets or civilians. Villagers also reported that an aircraft had attacked them, but US military officials denied these reports merely stating that an attack had indeed occurred and that they were looking into the results. At least two previous attacks of a similar nature occurred in 2007 where American forces targeted suspected al-Qaeda operatives in Ras Kamboni as well as in Bargal.

Jane's Defence Weekly, writing in its 12 March 2008 issue, said the attack was reportedly carried out by a US Navy submarine, firing Tomahawks. Jane's said several news reports said the target of the attack was Saleh Ali Saleh Nabhan, sought by the Federal Bureau of Investigation in connection with the 2002 Mombasa attacks in Kenya against a hotel and a civilian airliner.

See also 
 American military intervention in Somalia (2007–present)

References

External links
US missile strike targets 'Al-Qaeda leader' in Somalia
Al-Qaeda Terrorist Leader Targeted in Somali Town
US launches strike in Somalia against al-Qaeda throughout, including aim of January 2007 US strikes

Dobley
Dobley
Dobley
Conflicts in 2008
March 2008 events in Africa
Somalia War (2006–2009)
Somalia–United States military relations
Dobley